Joseph Alphonsus Lowrey (3 August 1879 – 8 August 1948) was an Australian rules footballer who played with South Melbourne in the Victorian Football League (VFL).

Notes

External links 

1879 births
1948 deaths
Australian rules footballers from Victoria (Australia)
Sydney Swans players